Stu Brooks (also known as Stu "Bassie" Brooks) is a Grammy nominated bassist, composer, producer, musical director, and co-founder of the experimental group Dub Trio. He is known for playing and recording with the Saturday Night Live Band, Lady Gaga, Mike Patton, Mark Guiliana, Dr. John, GRiZ, G-Unit, Matisyahu, Pretty Lights, and Meshell Ndegeocello.

Biography 
Stu Brooks is a Canadian born and Brooklyn-based bass player, producer, and songwriter. He has worked with artists such as Pretty Lights, Mike Patton, Lady Gaga, Lauryn Hill, 50 Cent, Meshell Ndegeocello, Mobb Deep, Mary J. Blige, Collie Buddz, Slick Rick, Eric Krasno, Mark Guiliana, Adam Deitch, and Tupac Shakur (posthumously).

His bass performances have played a role in the creation of many Billboard charting, Grammy nominated, and Platinum certified recordings, including Pretty Lights’ 2013 Grammy nominated “A Color Map Of The Sun”, Billboard hit “So Seductive featuring 50 Cent”, and Tony Yayo's Platinum Certified “Thoughts of a Predicate Felon”.

Brooks is currently the bassist and musical director for Grammy-nominated artist Matisyahu. His work with Matisyahu dates back to 2009 and spans four albums and multiple international tours. In 2014, Stu co-wrote and produced Matisyahu's release, Akeda.

During the summer of 2015, Brooks toured as the bassist for the Rock and Roll Hall of Fame inducted artist, Dr. John.

Since 2016, Brooks has been working on new material for upcoming releases from Dub Trio and Matisyahu.

Brooks also performed at Coachella in 2022 as Danny Elfman's bassist.  

From 2018, Brooks has been a sub in the Saturday Night Live Band.

Professional roles 
Writer & Composer for Matisyahu and Dub Trio
 Recording Artist for Lady Gaga, Pretty Lights, Lauryn Hill, Matisyahu, Mark Guiliana, Redman, Dub Trio, Mobb Deep, Lloyd Banks, G Unit Records, 50 Cent, Tupac Shakur, Ludacris, Mary J. Blige, Tony Yayo, and Young Buck
 Producer for Matisyahu, Dub Trio, Collie Buddz, Meshell Ndegeocello (remix), Circa Survive, Candiria, 311, Kabaka Pyramid, and King Buzzo.
 Music Director for Matisyahu, GRiZ Live Bad, Bonnaroo Super Jam.
 Live Performer with Dub Trio, Matisyahu, Dr. John, Mark Guiliana, Slick Rick, Mike Patton’s Peeping Tom, Gogol Bordello, Collie Buddz, Eric Krasno, Adam Deitch Project, and Topaz
 Television Performer on Late Show with David Letterman, Tonight Show with Jay Leno, The Tonight Show with Conan O'Brien, Jimmy Kimmel Live, The Henry Rollins Show, and Late Night with Conan O'Brien

Charted songs and RIAA certifications 
 Pretty Lights Bassist on album “A Color Map of the Sun ” #24 Billboard Top Albums, Grammy nominated - Best Dance/Electronic Album
 Matisyahu Composer, producer, and bassist on album “Akeda”  #36 Billboard Top 200, #8 Alternative Albums
 Matisyahu Composer and bassist on album “Light”  #1 Billboard Reggae for 34 weeks, #6 Alternative Albums
 Matisyahu Producer, composer, and bassist on live album and DVD “Live at Stubbs Vol. 2”  #2 Billboard Reggae, #30 Billboard 200
 Matisyahu Bassist on “Instant Karma – John Lennon / Amnesty International’s Campaign to Save Darfur”  #15 Billboard Top 200
 Peeping Tom Composer and producer on single “We’re Not Alone”  #1 Billboard Top Heatseekers, Chart Peak Position #1 (Aus), #103 Billboard 200 (U.S.), #3 Billboard Top Indie Albums, #7 Tastemaker albums
 Dub Trio Composer, producer, and bassist on “Drive By Dub”  #10 CMJ Top 200
 Mobb Deep Bassist on album “Blood Money”  #1 Top Hip Hop/R&B albums, #1 Rap Albums, #3 Billboard 200, #3 Digital Albums, #6 Canadian Albums, #4 Tastemaker Albums
 Lloyd Banks Bassist on album “Rotten Apple”  #3 Billboard 200, #1 Top HipHop/R&B Albums, #6 Billboard Canadian Albums, #15 Digital Albums, #1 Rap Albums, #2 Tastemaker Albums, #3 Top Album Sales
 Tupac Shakur Bassist on posthumous release “Pac’s Life”  #9 Billboard 200, #9 Digital Albums, #3 Top R&B/Hip Hop Albums, #3 Rap Album, #7 Taste Maker Album, #9 Top Albums Sales
 50 Cent Bassist on the single “So Seductive featuring 50 Cent”  #7 Billboard Hot R&B/HipHop Songs, #12 Rap Songs, #48 Hot 100, #55 Digital Songs, #8 R&B/Hip Hop Airplay, #7 Radio Songs, #12 Hot Rap Songs, BET Vibe Awards Won Best “Club Banger” (2005)
 Tony Yayo Bassist on “Thoughts of a Predicate Felon”  Certified Platinum, #2 Billboard 200, #2 Rap Album,#3 Canadian Albums, #2 Top R&B/Hip Hop Albums
Redman Bassist on album Reggie #118 Billboard 200, #22 Top R&B/Hip Hop Albums, #10 Rap Albums

Discography

Dub Trio
Sixes and Sevens/VCO Dub (2013)
IV (2011)
III EP (2010)
Another Sound is Dying (2008)
Cool Out and CoExist (2007)
 ROIR (Reachout International Records) Essential Dub compilation (2007)
New Heavy (2006)
Exploring the Dangers of (2004)

Matisyahu
Akeda (2014) 
Miracle EP (2011)
Live at Stubb's, Vol. 2 (2010)
The Disney Reggae Club
Light (2009)
Instant Karma: The Amnesty International Campaign to Save Darfur (2007)

G-Unit

50 Cent
Interscope Records Presents Club Bangers (2006)
Get Rich or Die Tryin’ (2005)

Mobb Deep
Blood Money (2006)

Lloyd Banks
Rotten Apple (2006)

Tony Yayo
 Thoughts of a Predicate Felon (2004)

Tupac Shakur
Pac's Life (2006)

Pretty Lights
A Color Map of the Sun (2013))

DJ Z-Trip
All Pro (2007) with Gift of Gab (rapper)

Peeping Tom
Peeping Tom (2006)

Ekundayo
Ekundayo (2011)

Eric Krasno
Reminisce (2009)

Candiria
Toying with the Insanities Vol. 1 (2009)

Mark Guiliana
My Life Starts Now (2014)

Meshell Ndegeocello
Comet Come To Me - Dub Trio Remix (2014)

Redman
Reggie (2010)

References 

Canadian bass guitarists
Canadian record producers
Living people
Year of birth missing (living people)